A by-election was held for the New South Wales Legislative Assembly electorate of St Leonards on 2 May 1860 because Edward Sayers resigned.

Dates

Polling places

Result

Edward Sayers resigned.

See also
Electoral results for the district of St Leonards
List of New South Wales state by-elections

References

1860 elections in Australia
New South Wales state by-elections
1860s in New South Wales